An N11 code (pronounced Enn-one-one) is a three-digit dialing code used in abbreviated dialing in the North American Numbering Plan (NANP). The mnemonic N stands for the digits 2 through 9 and thus the syntax stands for the codes 211, 311, 411, 511, 611, 711, 811, and 911. These dialing codes provide access to special local services, such a 911 for emergency services, which is a facility mandated by law in the United States.

Services
N11-numbers provide access to special services. For example,

2-1-1: Community services and information
3-1-1: Municipal government services, non-emergency number
4-1-1: Directory assistance
5-1-1: Traffic information or police non-emergency services
6-1-1: Telephone company (telco) customer service and repair
7-1-1: TDD and Relay Services for the deaf and hard of hearing
8-1-1: Underground public utility location (United States); non-emergency health information and services (Canada)
9-1-1: Emergency services (police, fire, ambulance and rescue services)

(4-1-1 and 6-1-1 are commonly used within the United States, but not officially assigned by the Federal Communications Commission.)

The designation for special use in the NANP prevents their use as area code or central office prefix, eliminating nearly 8,000,000 telephone numbers from assignment.

The assigned use of each N11 may vary for the various countries of the NANP, but 9-1-1 is mandated in the United States and Canada, while the availability of the other N11 codes varies by location. 7-1-1 and 9-1-1 access is mandated by law in the United States, even within private networks (PBX, enterprise and cellular systems).

4-1-1 and 6-1-1 are supported by the service provider for the calling phone, but not all carriers provide these services. 4-1-1 and 6-1-1 (formerly 8-1-1) are typically blocked within enterprise or private branch exchange (PBX) systems, including cellular telephone service purchased for an enterprise system, since 4-1-1 calls generally incur a fee and the service is now readily accessible by other means, and 6-1-1 services are managed by the enterprise in which the phone resides.

Other community services are provided through 2-1-1, but only if a nonprofit organization, such as United Way of America, or the local government operates it locally. Likewise, local, state or provincial government may, but do not uniformly, operate traffic information using 5-1-1. 8-1-1 was made mandatory in the United States in 2007; however, it has not been universally implemented. 7-1-1 is funded through the TRS Fund, which telephone companies are mandated to maintain to provide Relay Services for the Deaf and Hearing Impaired.

0-1-1 and 1-1-1
Within the NANP, a leading digit of 0 or 1 indicates special dialing arrangements. 1 is the toll-dialing prefix, or trunk prefix. 0-1-1 is the international calling prefix, dialed before a country code to call internationally. 1-1-1 is not designated for any service functions.

See also
Single non-emergency number
988 Suicide & Crisis Lifeline

References

External links
FAQ on Use of N11 Service Codes
N11 Codes Assignment from NANPA.com
Administered N11 Codes in Canada

North American Numbering Plan
Three-digit telephone numbers